Augustine Taneko (born October 3 1954) was a member of the National Parliament of Solomon Islands, representing the Shortlands constituency. He lives in Shortlands, in the Western Province, and was first elected in 2001. He was replaced by Steve Laore. After Steve Laore's death, Taneko ran for election to his former seat, finishing 2nd to Christopher Laore.

References

External links
Member page at Parliament website (archived)

1954 births
Living people
Members of the National Parliament of the Solomon Islands
People from the Western Province (Solomon Islands)